Sialic acid-binding Ig-like lectin 7 is a protein that in humans is encoded by the SIGLEC7 gene. SIGLEC7 has also been designated as CD328 (cluster of differentiation 328).

References

Further reading

External links
 

Clusters of differentiation
SIGLEC